Haukar is the handball section of Icelandic sports club  Haukar from Hafnarfjörður. Haukar do currently play in the Olís deildin. 
Haukar have often competed in the EHF Champions League among great results are victories over US Créteil Handball and FC Barcelona .

Men's team

Trophies 
Icelandic Championships (11):
 1943, 2000, 2001, 2003, 2004, 2005, 2008, 2009, 2010, 2015, 2016

Icelandic Cup: (7):
 1980, 1997, 2001, 2002,2010,2012,2014

Icelandic League Cup : (6):
 2006,2009,2011,2013,2014,2019

EHF Cup
Semifinal:2000-01

European record

Current roster
Squad for the 2016-17 season

Goalkeepers
 32  Giedrius Morkūnas
 12  Andri Scheving
 16  Gretar Ari Gudjonsson
Outside Players

 2  Tjorvi Thorgeirsson
 3  Orri Freyr Þorkelsson
 4  Adam Haukur Baumruk
 6  Brynjolfur Snær Brynjolfsson
 7  Þorður Rafn Guðmundsson
 8  Elias Mar Haldorsson
 9  Guðmundur Arni Olafsson

 10  Heimir Oli Heimisson
 11  Daniel Thor Ingason
 14  Brimir Bjornsson
 17  Kristinn Petursson
 18  Jón Þorbjörn Jóhannsson
 20  Aron Gauti Oskarsson
 23  Þorarinn Levi Traustason
 24  Andri Heimir Fridriksson
 28  Hakon Daði Styrmisson
 73  Einar Petur Petursson

Women's team

Titles 

 Olís deildin
 Winners (7) : 1945, 1946, 1996, 1997, 2001, 2002, 2005
 Icelandic Cup
 Winners (4) : 1997, 2003, 2006, 2007

European record

Current squad
Squad for the 2021–22 season.

Goalkeepers
 33  Margrét Einarsdóttir
Wingers
LW
 2  Elín Klara Þorkelsdóttir
 19  Birta Lind Jóhannsdóttir
RW
 5  Ragnheiður Ragnarsdóttir
 18  Berta Rut Harðardóttir
Line players
 11  Guðrún Jenný Sigurðardóttir
 27  Gunnhildur Pétursdóttir

Back players
LB
 20  Rósa Kristín Kemp
 22  Rakel Oddný Guðmundsdóttir
CB
 3  Berglind Benediktsdóttir
 7  Anna Lára Davíðsdóttir
 15  Natasja Anjodóttir Hammer
RB
 6  Sara Marie Oddén
 9  Karen Díönudóttir
 14  Ásta Björt Júlíusdóttir

Transfers

Transfers for the season 2022-23

 Joining

 Leaving

Technical staff
Staff for the season 2022-23.
  Head Coach: Gunnar Gunnarsson
  Assistant coach: Díana Guðjónsdóttir
  Team Leader: Harpa Melsted
  Team Leader: Alexandra Hödd Harðardóttir
  Doctor: Jóhann Guðmundsson

References

External links
 http://www.Haukar.is

Handball teams in Iceland